Andrey Nikolayevich Kapralov (born 7 October 1980) is a freestyle swimmer from Russia, who won the silver medal in the men's 200 metres freestyle event at the 2004 European Championships. He represented his native country at two consecutive Summer Olympics, starting in 2000 in Sydney, Australia.

References
 Profile
 

1980 births
Living people
Russian male swimmers
Swimmers at the 2000 Summer Olympics
Swimmers at the 2004 Summer Olympics
Swimmers at the 2008 Summer Olympics
Olympic swimmers of Russia
Russian male freestyle swimmers
World Aquatics Championships medalists in swimming
Medalists at the FINA World Swimming Championships (25 m)
European Aquatics Championships medalists in swimming
Universiade medalists in swimming
Universiade gold medalists for Russia
Universiade silver medalists for Russia
Medalists at the 2003 Summer Universiade
Medalists at the 2005 Summer Universiade
Swimmers from Saint Petersburg
20th-century Russian people
21st-century Russian people